Hans Willem Capel (born 3 June 1936) is a Dutch theoretical physicist. He was a professor of theoretical physics at the University of Amsterdam between 1983 and 1998.

Capel was born in Sceaux, France. He obtained his PhD in mathematics and physics at Leiden University in 1965 with a dissertation titled: "The hole-equivalence principle, the Van Vleck relation and the application to the theory of d-ions in Ligand fields". Capel subsequently was a lector of theoretical physics at the same university in 1970, and served as professor between 1979 and 1983. He is well known for introducing, in Statistical Physics, the Blume-Capel model, describing tricritical points.

Capel was elected a member of the Royal Netherlands Academy of Arts and Sciences in 1990.

References

External links
 

1936 births
Living people
20th-century Dutch physicists
Leiden University alumni
Academic staff of Leiden University
Members of the Royal Netherlands Academy of Arts and Sciences
Theoretical physicists
Academic staff of the University of Amsterdam